Petar Genchev (Bulgarian: Петър Генчев; born 29 March 1998) is a Bulgarian footballer who plays as a centre-back for Sozopol.

Career

Septemvri Sofia
Genchev begin his career in Chernomoretz Burgas and won bronze medal at 2013 with U15 team, coached by Angel Stoykov. After the tournament, he moved with 5 more Burgas boys at Dit Sofia, later moving to Septemvri Sofia after the Dit academy took Septemvri. In 2015 he started the season with Septemvri in V Group, but later during the same season he was loaned to Pirin Razlog in the B Group.

Genchev completed his professional debut on 17 July 2017, playing in the first league game for the season in First League against Dunav Ruse. He was chosen for the perfect eleven from the second round of First League match against Pirin Blagoevgrad, which was won by Septemvri.

On 4 July 2018, Genchev was loaned to Second League club CSKA 1948 until the end of the season.
 
He left Septemvri Sofia in July 2019.

Ludogorets Razgrad
In August 2019 Genchev signed with  the Bulgarian champions Ludogorets Razgrad and joined to their reserve squad. He made his professional debut on 5 August in a 2:0 league victory over Spartak Pleven.

On 24 August 2020 Genchev was included in the Champions League squad for the match against FC Midtjylland after the injury of Georgi Terziev.

Botev Vratsa
In December 2020 Genchev resigned his contract with Ludogorets Razgrad to join Botev Vratsa in First League

International career

Youth levels
Genchev was called up for the Bulgaria U19 team for the 2017 European Under-19 Championship qualification from 22 to 27 March 2017. Playing in all three matches, Bulgaria qualified for the knockout phase.

Career statistics

Club

References

External links
 

1998 births
Living people
Sportspeople from Burgas
Bulgarian footballers
Bulgaria youth international footballers
Bulgaria under-21 international footballers
Association football central defenders
FC Septemvri Sofia players
FC Pirin Razlog players
PFC Ludogorets Razgrad II players
FC CSKA 1948 Sofia players
First Professional Football League (Bulgaria) players
Second Professional Football League (Bulgaria) players